Boris Becker was the defending champion, but lost in the final to Yevgeny Kafelnikov. The score was 7–5, 5–7, 7–6(8–6).

Seeds

Draw

Finals

Top half

Bottom half

References

External links
 Official results archive (ATP)
 Official results archive (ITF)

Milan Indoor
1995 ATP Tour
Milan